Gwanggyo refers to a planned city surrounding Yeongtong-gu of Suwon and Suji-gu (or Giheung-gu) of Yongin. Located about 25 km south of Seoul, Gwanggyo New Town has an area 11 square kilometers and was designated as such in 2004 by Gyeonggi Province, the city governments of Suwon and Yongin, and Gyeonggi Development Corp. (GICO). It will accommodate more than 31,000 households. In addition to increasing housing supply, Gwanggyo New Town also aims to achieve several other regional goals such as relocation of the provincial office, a new convention center, and creating a core for economic growth in Gyeonggi province. Its infrastructure was scheduled to be constructed by 2012.

New towns in South Korea
New towns started in the 2000s